The Church of Wells (formerly the Church of Arlington, or You Must Be Born Again (YMBBA) Ministries) is an American religious group considered by some to be a cult located in Wells, Texas. The group is led by Sean Morris, Jacob Gardner, and Ryan Ringnald, former street preachers who are all in their early thirties. It has approximately ninety members, many being young adults and children. The church was founded in 2011.

The church and its members have been involved in several controversies. Many church members have engaged in disorderly and disruptive behavior such as disrupting a Lakewood Church service, which has led to some criminal charges and convictions. They believe this is consistent with biblical persecution. Accounts of individuals abandoning their families and former way of life, such as Catherine Grove, have led to the idea that the church could be an emerging cult. One man claimed he was kidnapped and drugged by the church; his story aired on the talk show Dr. Phil.

Beliefs

According to their website, the Church of Wells promotes a revivalist approach to Christianity. They believe that most of Christian America is a "darkened generation" buried under a "mountain of apostasy". They place a high emphasis on the new birth, denying many forms of entertainment and leisure in favor of prayer (with sessions often lasting several hours a day), fasting, and deep loathing for their own sin.

They feature this verse prominently in their belief system: "If any man come to me, and hate not his father, and mother, and wife, and children, and brethren, and sisters, yea, and his own life also, he cannot be my disciple" (Luke 14:26).

Controversies
In May 2012, a three-day-old infant whose parents were believed to belong to the group passed away. Instead of seeking medical attention, church members attended the apartment and prayed for the baby for "hours". Members of the Cherokee County Sheriff's Office stated that the baby had passed away the previous day. The Sheriff's Office and Child Protective Services began investigating the incident.

In July 2013, Catherine Grove, 26, disappeared from her home in Arkansas without notice, abandoning her car and belongings, only to resurface weeks later under heavy guard at the Church of Wells. She said that she was not being held against her will, and was only "seeking the Lord." This is consistent with the accounts of several other members who have cut off nearly all contact with their friends and family. Based on these incidents, the Church of Wells has often been called an emerging cult. On April 2, 2015, Grove called her father, said "I need you in Wells," and hung up the phone. Four hours later, Grove was seen walking down U.S. Highway 69 headed towards Lufkin, Texas. A few minutes after crossing the Angelina County line, she called 9-1-1 using a motorist's cell phone. During the call, Grove sounded "frightened" and "confused." Deputies drove Grove to the Angelina County Sheriff's Office in Lufkin. Captain Alton Lenderman of the Angelina County Sheriff's Office described Grove as being "very meek and very afraid to speak." Captain Lenderman stated that he did not press Grove on why she left the church, but did state that she never mentioned wanting to go back. When asked if she was hungry she said that she wished to have a burger and fries from Burger King. Grove's father was contacted and they were reunited in Lufkin the next day at 1:00 am. Grove initially showed intention to leave the church, but she returned to the church twelve days later on April 14, 2015.

In October 2013, Lufkin police received a call that three men were seen approaching Lufkin High School at 4:50 pm. When police arrived, the men were identified by a reporter as members of the Church of Wells. The police issued criminal trespassing warnings and the three men were banned from all Lufkin Independent School District campuses. According to Lufkin ISD spokeswoman Sheila Adams, the incident was "very peaceful."
 
In April 2014, Sean Morris and member Taylor Clifton were injured following a physical altercation during the Wells community homecoming parade. Witnesses report the two men caused a disturbance by "preaching harshly and screaming 'You're going to hell' to children, parents and parade-goers." In the recorded video of the preaching of Taylor Clifton, he can be heard saying of God, "He loves you. He cares for you." The injured members did not fight back, nor did they press charges.

On June 28, 2015, six members of the Church of Wells interrupted a service of Lakewood Church in Houston, heckling Pastor Joel Osteen and calling him a liar. In June 2016 four of the members of the Church of Wells involved in the incident were tried and acquitted of disturbing a public meeting by a Texas jury. 

On November 30, 2015, the Lufkin Police Department received several calls claiming church member Taylor Clifton and other members were yelling, following people, and interfering with parade floats during the 2015 annual Christmas parade. They were accused of yelling "He doesn't want you to burn" and "it is an abomination." When police arrived, they explained that the church could continue to share their message as long as it didn't disrupt the parade. All the church members complied except Clifton, who continued to yell, scaring young children and upsetting parents. Police attempted to calm Clifton (as well as the parents and children), but he refused to comply and was arrested. During the incident, one member of the church was assaulted by a civilian, but charges were not filed. Clifton was charged with disorderly conduct and interfering with an event. Judge Derrick Flournoy found Clifton guilty of disorderly conduct and not guilty of interfering with an event. He posted bond for $1000, was released on December 1, and was fined $100.

On December 28, 2015, church members Matthew DeRouville and James Robert MacPherson III were arrested in Alto, Texas for refusing to leave an auto parts store after telling an unmarried pregnant employee she would go to Hell if she did not repent. In June 2017, DeRouville and MacPherson were found guilty of criminal trespassing, sentenced to spend 90 days in jail, and fined $2000; however, they paid their fine within 14 days and spent only 45 days in jail.

In March 2016, members of the church disrupted a Baptist church service in Saranac Lake, New York.

In October 2016, Jordan Reichenberger was approached by two church elders in downtown Austin. He claims that they gave him a water bottle that was "laced in drugs" and drove him to the church complex in Wells. Five days later, his family was able to track him down using his cell phone. Reichenberger's family had a verbal dispute with church members and, after several hours, were able to get Reichenberger out of the compound. Reichenberger claims he was habitually drugged during his time at the complex and was physically held there against his will. He claimed that subsequent hair analysis showed evidence of the drugging. Reichenberger's story aired on the talk show Dr. Phil. During the show, local mainline pastor James Maddox discussed his opinion on the church. He said that he believed there were "sweat lodges" where people were deprived of sleep, water, and nutrition as a form of indoctrination. The parents of Catherine Grove also appeared and discussed their story on the show.

In June 2022 Texas Monthly reported that one of the church's side businesses, a sawmill, was responsible for 25 percent of all reported sawmill accidents in the entire state, along with allegations of child labor law violations and unreported accidents.  In addition the sawmill's purported owner was sued by Green Mountain Energy for over $16,000 in unpaid electric bills.

References

External links
 Church of Wells website
 ABC Nightline Prime special on the Church of Wells: Part 1 2 3
 Theological Arguments Against the Church of Wells: 1 2 3 4 5
 Four-part podcast series on the COW by Dr. Scott Johnson
 Texas Monthly
 Discerning the Church of Wells

Churches in Cherokee County, Texas
Christian fundamentalism
Christian new religious movements